Scott Douglas Robinson (born March 29, 1964) is a Canadian retired professional ice hockey player and coach. He played one game in the National Hockey League for the Minnesota North Stars in the 1989–90 season, on February 4, 1990 against the New York Rangers. The rest of his professional career was spent in the IHL with the Kalamazoo Wings and Milwaukee Admirals.

Robinson was born in 100 Mile House, British Columbia. After his playing career he coached the Cowichan Valley Capitals of the British Columbia Hockey League from 2003 to 2010.

Career statistics

Regular season and playoffs

Awards
 WHL West Second All-Star Team – 1985

See also
 List of players who played only one game in the NHL

External links
 

1964 births
Living people
Calgary Dinos ice hockey players
Canadian ice hockey right wingers
Ice hockey people from British Columbia
Kalamazoo Wings (1974–2000) players
Milwaukee Admirals (IHL) players
Minnesota North Stars players
People from the Cariboo Regional District
Seattle Breakers players
Undrafted National Hockey League players